Lucy A. Snyder (born 1971) is an American science fiction, fantasy, humor, horror, and nonfiction writer.

Biography
Born in South Carolina, Snyder grew up in San Angelo, Texas, after her father was briefly assigned to Goodfellow Air Force Base. She graduated from Angelo State University and then moved to Bloomington, Indiana, for graduate studies in environmental science and journalism at Indiana University.  She is a graduate of the 1995 Clarion Workshop; authors Nalo Hopkinson and Kelly Link were among her classmates.

She lives in Columbus, Ohio, with her husband and occasional coauthor Gary A. Braunbeck.

Writings
Over 80 of her short stories have appeared in various magazines, anthologies, and collections, including Apex Magazine, Nightmare Magazine, Pseudopod, Escape Pod and Short Trips: Destination Prague. One of her online humor stories, "Installing Linux on a Dead Badger", became the basis for a short humor collection of the same name published in 2007. Her 2012 horror story "Magdala Amygdala" won the Bram Stoker Award for Superior Achievement in Short Fiction and was selected to appear in The Best Horror of the Year Volume Five (edited by Ellen Datlow).

Her poetry has appeared in Lady Churchill's Rosebud Wristlet, GUD Magazine and Weird Tales. In March 2010, Snyder was awarded a Bram Stoker Award for Superior Achievement in Poetry for her collection Chimeric Machines.

Snyder served as an editor for HMS Beagle, an online bioscience publication produced by Elsevier, and briefly served as a contributing editor for Strange Horizons. Since January 2010, she has mentored students in Seton Hill University's MFA program in Writing Popular Fiction.

Bibliography

Novels 
 Spellbent (Del Rey Books, 2009, nominated for a Bram Stoker Award for Best First Novel)
 Shotgun Sorceress (Del Rey Books, 2010)
 Switchblade Goddess (Del Rey Books, 2011)
 Devils' Field (Alliteration Ink, 2015)

Serials 
 A Glimpse of Darkness (Del Rey Books, 2010, co-written with Lara Adrian, Harry Connolly, Kelly Meding, and Stacia Kane)

Collections 
 Blood Magic (2001)
 Sparks and Shadows (2007)
 Installing Linux on a Dead Badger (2007)
 Chimeric Machines (2009, Bram Stoker Award winner)
 Orchid Carousals (2013)
 Soft Apocalypses (2014, Bram Stoker Award winner)
 While the Black Stars Burn (2015)
 Garden of Eldritch Delights (2018)

Nonfiction books 
 Shooting Yourself in the Head For Fun and Profit: A Writer's Survival Guide (2014, Bram Stoker Award winner)

References

Sources
 Burgess, Liz: "Technomancy and the Zombie Apocalypse", Sequential Tart, July 9, 2007.

External links
 
 Livejournal
 Installing Linux on a Dead Badger: User's Notes
 
 Interview at GUD Magazine
 Interview at Nightmare Magazine

1971 births
Living people
21st-century American novelists
American fantasy writers
American horror writers
American science fiction writers
American women short story writers
American women novelists
Dark fantasy writers
Indiana University alumni
Women science fiction and fantasy writers
Women horror writers
21st-century American women writers
21st-century American short story writers